The following lists events that happened during 1861 in Chile.

Incumbents
President of Chile: Manuel Montt (until September 18), José Joaquín Pérez

Events

July
16 July - Chilean presidential election, 1861

December
December - Occupation of Araucanía

Births
10 August - Rafael Valentín Errázuriz (d. 1923)

Deaths
23 October - José María Linares (b. 1808)

References 

 
1860s in Chile
Chile
Chile
Years of the 19th century in Chile